Castello di Serravalle is a town in the comune of Valsamoggia in the Metropolitan City of Bologna in the Italian region Emilia-Romagna, located about  southwest of Bologna. Until 1 January 2014 it was an independent comune.

Main sights 
 13th century rocca (castle)
 Baroque church of St. Apollinaris
 Medieval palace at Cuzzano
 Regional park of the Abbey of Monteveglio

References

External links 
 Official website

Cities and towns in Emilia-Romagna